Vladimir Urbanovich (born 1932) is a Soviet and Russian baritone, professor, and People’s Artist of the RSFSR (1983).

Biography 
From 1965 onwards, Urbanovich was a soloist at the Novosibirsk Opera and Ballet Theater. He performed more than 60 parts of the baritone repertoire in opera classics and modern works. He toured in Poland (1986), Egypt (1993), Portugal (1996), participated in the production of Boris Godunov at the Baden Theater (Germany, 1994). He starred in several television film operas, including Yuri Butsko's Diary of a Madman.

He also performed as a concert singer, and taught at the Novosibirsk Conservatory.

References 

20th-century Russian male opera singers
Soviet male opera singers
Russian operatic baritones
1932 births
Novosibirsk Opera and Ballet Theatre
Living people
Academic staff of Novosibirsk Conservatory